Mohamed Deroukdal (born 2 December 1980) is an Algeria]] professional footballer. He plays as a defender for the Algerian Ligue 2 club Olympique de Médéa.

Statistics

References

1980 births
Living people
Algerian footballers
Olympique de Médéa players
Algerian Ligue Professionnelle 1 players
Algerian Ligue 2 players
Paradou AC players
OMR El Annasser players
USM Blida players
RC Kouba players
People from Kouba
IB Khémis El Khechna players
Association football defenders
21st-century Algerian people